Fairholme or Fairholm may refer to:

Fairholme Island, Nunavut, Canada
Fairholme Range, Alberta, Canada
Fairholm, Washington, United States
Fairholme College, Australia
Fairholme (John Street Home), Cadiz, Kentucky, a historic house listed on the National Register of Historic Places
Fairholme (Newport, Rhode Island), a historic mansion in Newport, Rhode Island, United States
Fairholme, Saskatchewan, Canada

People with the surname
George Fairholme (1789–1846), Scottish geologist
James Walter Fairholme (1821–c. 1848), British Royal Navy officer
Jeff Fairholm (born 1965), Canadian football player
Larry Fairholm (born 1941), Canadian football player